The Puerto Rico women's national under-20 football team represents Puerto Rico in tournaments at the under-20 level of women's competitions. The team is controlled by the Puerto Rican Football Federation.

History
Puerto Rico women's national under-20 team have played their first match against Dominican Republic women's national under-20 football team and they won it by 4–0 goals which took place at Labadee, Haiti on 8 January 2002. In the recent performance of the team are very good the team have reached into the semifinals of 2022 CONCACAF Women's U-20 Championship. Puerto Rico women's national under-20 soccer have not yet qualified to FIFA U-20 Women's World Cup.

Players
The following squad were called-up recently finished 2022 CONCACAF Women's U-20 Championship

Fixtures and results
Legend

2022

Competitive records

FIFA U-20 Women's World Cup

CONCACAF Women's U-20 Championship

References

North American women's national under-20 association football teams
North American national under-20 association football teams

Puerto Rico women's national football team